Guy Finley (born February 22, 1949) is an American self-help writer, philosopher, spiritual teacher, and former professional songwriter and musician.

Early life and career 

The son of late-night talk show pioneer Larry Finley, Finley grew up in the Los Angeles, California, area where many of his childhood friends were the children of celebrities. At a young age, he decided to pursue a music career. He became the first white soft rock artist signed to the Motown Records label. While never achieving commercial success as a recording artist, several of his songs were recorded by popular artists including Diana Ross, the Jackson 5, and Debby Boone in the 1970s. He also composed scores for a number of motion pictures and TV shows. In spite of this growing good fortune early in his professional life, Finley has said he still felt something was missing in his personal life. Seeking to fill this void, he abandoned his music career and left for India and the Far East in 1979 to study spiritual teachings and the principles of self-awareness.

Writing career and teachings 

By the early 1980s, Finley's search for spiritual awakening had led him back to the United States where he became a devoted student of spiritual teacher Vernon Howard at the New Life Foundation in Boulder City, Nevada. In the early 1990s, he began a new career as an author of spiritual guidance books.

His teachings draw from many different spiritual traditions and philosophies including: Christian mysticism, various Eastern philosophies, Fourth Way and Jungian psychology.

In addition to his writing, Finley teaches inner-life classes at the Life of Learning Foundation in Merlin, Oregon, a non-profit organization of which he is founder and director. Classes are live-streamed. He also speaks at conferences and is a frequent interview guest on radio and the internet.

Works

Books
The Secret of Letting Go (1990; revised: 2007) Secret Way of Wonder:Insights from the Silence (1992)Freedom From the Ties That Bind (1994)Designing Your Own Destiny:The Power to Shape Your Future (1996)The Intimate Enemy:Winning the War Within Yourself (with Dr. Ellen Dickstein) (1997)The Lost Secrets of Prayer:Practices for Self-Awakening (1998)Seeker's Guide to Self-Freedom:Truths for Living (2001)Apprentice of the Heart (2003)Let Go and Live in the Now:Awaken the Peace, Power and Happiness in Your Heart (2004)365 Days to Let Go: Daily Insights to Change Your Life (2007) The Essential Laws of Fearless Living:Find the Power to Never Feel Powerless Again (2008) Letting Go a Little Bit At a Time (2009) The Courage to Be Free: Discover Your Original Fearless Self (2010) The Seeker, The Search, The Sacred (2011) The Secret of Your Immortal Self: Key Lessons for Realizing the Divinity Within (2015) Relationship Magic: Waking Up Together (2018) 

e-booksBeyond Dependency: The Death of AddictionThe Devils 13 Most Trusted Lies: (To Keep You From the Light)Who Put That Stone In My Shoe?:How to Walk Away From the Intimate Enemy50 Ways to Let More Love Into Your LifeBooklets30 Keys to Change Your Destiny5 Steps to Complete FreedomSelected list of audio programsEducation of the Soul:Answering the Longing for ImmortalityLiberation of ConsciousnessLiving in the Light:Helping Ourselves And Others Awaken to A Higher LifeLiving Now:Secrets of the Extraordinary LifeBeing Fearless and FreeSecrets of Being UnstoppableSecret Teachings of the Sacred TestamentsSeven Characteristics of Higher ConsciousnessSeven Steps to Oneness:Journey to a Whole New LifeTeachings of the Timeless KindnessThe Genesis of Love:Relationship Magic in Heaven and on EarthThe Heart & Soul of Freedom:Liberation From LimitationThe Illusion of Limitation:The Liberation of SelfThe Meditative LifeThe Road to Good FortuneThe Turning Point:The Power of a Life AwakenedWaking Up Together:Building Compassionate Relationships Founded in Higher LoveLiberate Your SelfSecrets of Spiritual SuccessThe Majestic LifeThe Meaning of LifeWisdom's Path to the Happiness WithinFor the Love of LifeLife Is Real Only When You AreForever FreeThe Golden Rule of Self-RealizationThe Secret of Your Immortal SelfThe 6 Characteristics of Higher Self-CommandComing Out of the DarkSeeds of the SoulBreaking Through the Fear BarrierDeepen Your Relationship With the DivineSee also
American philosophy
List of American philosophers

Notes

References
 Contemporary Authors'' Volume 209, p. 175. Thomson-Gale, 2003.

External links 

Life of Learning Foundation
Official OneJourney site

1949 births
Living people
20th-century Christian mystics
21st-century Christian mystics
American Christian mystics
American radio personalities
American self-help writers
American spiritual teachers
American spiritual writers
Protestant mystics
Radio personalities from Oregon
Writers from Los Angeles
People from Josephine County, Oregon